Religious discrimination in Pakistan is a serious issue for the human rights situation in modern-day Pakistan. Hindus, Christians, Sikhs, Shias, and Ahmadis among other religious minorities often face discrimination and at times are even subjected to violence. In some cases Christian churches and the worshippers themselves have been attacked. Khawaja Nazimuddin, the 2nd Prime Minister of Pakistan, stated: "I do not agree that religion is a private affair of the individual nor do I agree that in an Islamic state every citizen has identical rights, no matter what his caste, creed or faith be".

One of the significant issues being faced by minority communities is the abuse of the blasphemy law. People belonging to minority religions are often falsely accused of using derogatory remarks against the Islamic prophet Muhammad, resulting in fines, lengthy prison sentences, and sometimes the death penalty. Often these accusations are made to settle personal vendettas and, due to the bias against minorities, victims are often immediately presumed guilty without any substantive evidence.

According to 1951 census, Non-Muslims constituted 14.20% of total Pakistan's (West Pakistan and East Pakistan) population. In West Pakistan (now Pakistan), the Non-Muslims constituted 3.44% of the total population while East Pakistan (now Bangladesh) had a significant share comprising 23.20 per cent of the population therein.
One reason for low Non-Muslim percentage is because of higher birth rates among the Muslims. Another reason was due to constant migration of India and Pakistan's respective minorities after the partition of India in 1947. However, the main reason as to why the population of minorities declined was due to the separation of East Pakistan (present day Bangladesh) which constituted almost 18% of Pakistan's Hindu population according to the 1961 Pakistani census. After the independence of Bangladesh, all minorities (mostly Hindus) that lived in the former East Pakistan were no longer counted in the census as they were officially Bangladeshis, and not Pakistanis. Due to the fact that Hindus made up the large bulk of the minority population, the percentage of Pakistan's minorities plummeted.

In the 1951 census, West Pakistan had 1.6% Hindu population, while East Pakistan (modern Bangladesh) had 22.05%. By 1997, the percentage of Hindus remained stable at 1.6% in Pakistan, while in Bangladesh, it had dropped to 9.2% by 2011, with non-Muslims accounting for 10.2% of the population.

In 1999 the United Nations Human Rights Council approved the first resolution against defamation of religions. However these resolutions have been severely criticized by the United States, various European nations and freedom of religion groups as these resolutions contained language which could be used to discriminate against minority religions, and in March 2010 the UN refused to enact the most recent resolution.

In 2011 religious intolerance was reported to be at its height, hundreds of minorities, women, journalists and liberals were being killed by Islamist fundamentalist extremists, while the  Government remained mostly a silent spectator, often only making statements which condemned the ruthless acts of violence by the extremists but taking no real concrete action against them.

Progress on religious freedom is being made gradually as Pakistan transitions to democracy from Zia's legacy, in 2016 Sindh with Pakistan's largest Hindu minority passed a bill that outlawed forced conversions. However, the bill was never ratified by the Governor. The bill was tabled by a faction of the Pakistan Muslim League which in Sindh is led by Sufi leader Pir Pagara, called PML-F, Pakistan Muslim League functional. In 2014, NGOs estimated that around 1000 girls from minority groups every year are being forcibly converted to Islam. In November 2019, a parliamentary committee was formed to prevent act of forced conversion in Pakistan.

During the COVID-19 pandemic in Pakistan, reports emerged that rations were being denied to minority Hindus and Christians in the coastal areas of Karachi. The Saylani Welfare Trust, carrying out the relief work, said that the aid was reserved for Muslims alone. On 14 April, the US Commission on International Religious Freedom expressed concern with the discrimination. Other organisations, including Edhi Foundation, JDC Welfare Organization and Jamaat-e-Islami are reported to have stepped forward to provide relief to the minorities.

Violence against minorities

Attacks on religious minorities in Pakistan have claimed hundreds of lives of religious minorities, such as Hindus, Pakistani Ahmadis, Shia, Sufis and Christians.

Women belonging to minority communities have been targets of forced conversions and marriages. Forced conversion, rape, and forced marriages of Hindu women in Pakistan have recently become controversial in Pakistan.

Attacks on minorities in the country have led to condemnation of policies that are discriminatory to religious minorities in Pakistan. Following the 2010 Lahore massacre, United Nations Secretary-General Ban Ki-moon said "Members of this religious community have faced continuous threats, discrimination and violent attacks in Pakistan. There is a real risk that similar violence might happen again unless advocacy of religious hatred that constitutes incitement to discrimination, hostility or violence is adequately addressed. The Government must take every step to ensure the security of members of all religious minorities and their places of worship so as to prevent any recurrence of today’s dreadful incident." Ban's spokesperson expressed condemnation and extended his condolences to the families of the victims and to the Government.

The United States ambassador to Pakistan, Anne W. Patterson, issued an unusually strong statement saying Pakistan had witnessed an increase in "provocative statements that promote intolerance and are an incitement to extremist violence."

An editorial published in Dawn condemned the attacks, commenting that "Bigotry in this country has been decades in the making and is expressed in a variety of ways. Violence by individuals or groups against those who hold divergent views may be the most despicable manifestation of such prejudice but it is by no means the only one. Religious minorities in Pakistan have not only been shunted to the margins of society but also face outright persecution on a regular basis."

Ahmadis

Pakistan made an amendment to its constitution in 1974, declaring Ahmadis as non-Muslims. In the following decade, military dictator Muhammad Zia-ul-Haq prohibited Ahmadis from calling themselves as Muslims.

The May 2010 Lahore attacks left 94 dead and more than 120 injured in nearly simultaneous attacks against two mosques of the minority Ahmadiyya Community Tehrik-i-Taliban Pakistan, as well as their Punjab wing, claimed responsibility for the attacks and were also blamed by the Pakistani police.

The Ahmadi community released a persecution report in 2018 in which the discrimination faced by Ahmadis in Pakistan has been detailed including "indiscriminate arrests" of people from the community. Ahmadis are forbidden to call themselves Muslims or use Islamic symbols in their religious practices. They are also mandated to declare themselves as Non-Muslims in order to vote in general elections. Another report listed 3963 news items and 532 editorial pieces in the country's Urdu-language media for spreading "hate propaganda" against Ahmadis.

In September 2018, several Islamist groups in Pakistan publicly opposed the selection of Atif Mian, who is from the Ahmadi community, as a member of the government's Economic Advisory Council. He was removed less than a week after selection owing to pressure from Islamist groups. Voice of America reported that after the ouster of Mian the "Ahmadi community fears a renewed sense of religious intolerance and discrimination" in Pakistan.

Christians

In 2005, a mob set churches and Christian schools on fire in Faisalabad, forcing Christians to flee from their homes. In 2009, a mob set fire to about 40 houses and a church in Gojra and burnt eight people alive.

On 22 September 2013, a twin suicide bomb attack took place at All Saints Church in Peshawar, Pakistan, in which 127 people were killed and over 250 injured. On 15 March 2015, two blasts took place at Roman Catholic Church and Christ Church  during Sunday service at Youhanabad town of Lahore. At least 15 people were killed and seventy were wounded in the attacks.

A church in Quetta was bombed with 9 being killed. The Islamic State group took responsibility for the attack.

According to an Open Doors claim in November 2017, Pakistan had the highest number of Christians killed in the world during the 12-month time period of 1 November 2015 to 31 October 2016, with 76 Christians being killed in the country. Pakistan also topped the list of most number of documented church attacks, accounting for 600 of the total 1329 churches attacked worldwide during the same time period.

Hindus

In 2003, a six-year-old Sikh girl was kidnapped by a member of the Afridi tribe in Northwest Frontier Province; the alleged kidnapper claimed the girl was actually 12-years-old, and had converted to Islam so therefore could not be returned to her non-Muslim family.
On January 4, 2005, 16 year old Hemi and 18 year old Marvi were kidnapped from Kunri village in Umerkot district.
On March 3, 2005, 14 year old Raji was kidnapped from Aslam Town Jhuddo in Mirpurkhas District.
On December 22, 2005, 13 year old Mashu was kidnapped from Jhaluree village in Mirpur Khas District.
On July 23, 2006, 15 year-old Pooja was kidnapped from Lyari town in Karachi District. A judge ruled that she should be released and although she was, she was kidnapped again and has been missing ever since.
On August 2, 2006, 16 year old Komal was kidnapped from Hawks bay in Karachi District.
On December 31, 2006, 17 year old Deepa was kidnapped from Tharparkar district in Sindh province.
In May 2007, members of the Christian community of Charsadda in the North West Frontier Province of Pakistan, close to the border of Afghanistan, reported that they had received letters threatening bombings if they did not convert to Islam, and that the police were not taking their fears seriously.
In June 2009, International Christian Concern (ICC) reported the rape and killing of a Christian man in Pakistan, for refusing to convert to Islam.
Rinkle Kumari, a 19-year Pakistani student, Lata Kumari, and Asha Kumari, a Hindu working in a beauty parlor, were allegedly forced to convert from Hinduism to Islam. Their cases were appealed all the way to the Supreme Court of Pakistan. The appeal was admitted but remained unheard ever after.
On September 23, 2014, Joti Kumari, a student of Electrical Engineering was kidnapped from Larkana City in Sindh District.
A total of 57 Hindus converted in Pasrur during May 14–19. On May 14, 35 Hindus of the same family were forced to convert by their employer because his sales dropped after Muslims started boycotting his eatable items as they were prepared by Hindus as well as their persecution by the Muslim employees of neighbouring shops according to their relatives. Since the impoverished Hindus had no other way to earn and needed to keep the job to survive, they converted. 14 members of another family converted on May 17 since no one was employing them, later another Hindu man and his family of eight under pressure from Muslims converted to Islam to avoid their land being grabbed.
In 2017, the Sikh community in Hangu district of Pakistan's Khyber-Pakhtunkhwa province alleged that they were “being forced to convert to Islam” by a government official. Farid Chand Singh, who filed the complaint, has claimed that Assistant Commissioner Tehsil Tall Yaqoob Khan was allegedly forcing Sikhs to convert to Islam and the residents of Doaba area are being tortured religiously.
On April 29, 2017, a 17 year old, Priya Kaur, a Sikh girl was kidnapped from Buner district.
In June, 2017, 16-year-old Ravita Meghwar was kidnapped in Sindh.
Hindu sisters Reena and Raveena became the face of forced religious conversion in Pakistan in 2019. It prompted the Indian External Affairs Ministry to ask Pakistan to submit a report about it.
January, 2019, 16 year old Anusha Kumari was kidnapped and the Indian High Commission took up the matter, but no action was taken.
A Sikh girl, kidnapped and married to a Muslim is yet to return home despite the Governor of Punjab assuring to send her back to her parents in 2019.
In 2020, Mehak Kumari a 15-year-old Hindu girl was kidnapped, forcibly converted and married to a Muslim man. She was later rescued by the police. The Court ordered her to be sent to a Women's protection centre. In the court she said that she didn't want to convert and to be sent back to her parents' house. Soon after, Islamic clerics in Pakistan demanded the beheading of Mehak Kumari for renouncing Islam after being converted.
A bride was allegedly kidnapped with the help of the police in January 2020 from her wedding and forcibly married to a Muslim.
In 2020, a 14-year-old Christian girl was allegedly abducted, converted to Islam and married off to a Muslim man in Karachi. However, in the court, the judges maintained that the girl has already had her first menstrual cycle and under the Islamic Shariah Law she should be considered an adult, making her marriage with her abductor legal and justified.

On 18 October 2005, Sanno Amra and Champa, a Hindu couple residing in the Punjab Colony, Karachi, Sindh returned home to find that their three teenage daughters had disappeared. After inquiries to the local police, the couple discovered that their daughters had been taken to a local madrassah, had been converted to Islam, and were denied unsupervised contact with their parents. In January 2017, a Hindu temple was demolished in Pakistan's Haripur district.

In 2006, a Hindu temple in Lahore was destroyed to pave the way for construction of a multi-storied commercial building. When reporters from Pakistan-based newspaper Dawn tried to cover the incident, they were accosted by the henchmen of the property developer, who denied that a Hindu temple existed at the site.

In July 2010, about 60 Hindus were attacked by 150 residents in Murad Memon Goth neighbourhood of Karachi and ethnically cleansed following an incident when a Hindu youth drank from a water tap near an Islamic mosque. About seven were injured, the injured stated that 400 Hindu families were being threatened to leave the area. In January 2014, in an attack on a temple in Peshawar, the guard was gunned down.

On March 15, 2014, a crowd of Muslims burnt a Hindu temple and a dharmashala in Larkana, Sindh, Pakistan, after unverified allegations of a Hindu youth desecrating a copy of the Quran. In January 2014, a policeman standing guard outside a Hindu temple at Peshawar was gunned down. The 25 March 2014 Express Tribune citing an All Pakistan Hindu Rights Movement (PHRM) survey said that 95% of all Hindu temples in Pakistan have been converted since 1990.

A senior Pakistani journalist stated that "Wealthy Muslim farmers see [Hindu girls] as fair game for abductions, rape, and prolonged sexual exploitation in captivity. Some notorious religious establishments proudly validate these alleged crimes. State institutions, the police and politicians have encouraged the trend by looking the other way." Harris Khalique claimed that "madrassas provide an institutional backing and that cannot happen if the state does not allow that. I rest the responsibility of such incidents squarely on the state, which fails its citizens."

In 2019, Fayyaz ul Hassan Chohan, the information and culture minister of Punjab province made derogatory remarks against the Hindu community in a television programme. However, later on, he apologised for his derogatory remarks and insisted that his remarks were aimed at Indian armed forces and Indian government and not against any Hindu community.

On April 10, 2019, Pakistan decided to restore over 400 Hindu temples which were either demolished or converted for other uses. Pakistan's federal government stated they are fulfilling the longstanding demand of the minority Hindus that their places of worship be restored to them. This action has been welcomed by the Hindu community living in Pakistan. The process will begin with two historic temples in Sialkot and Peshawar. According to a recent government estimate, at least 11 temples in Sindh, four in Punjab, three in Balochistan and two in Khyber Pakhtunkhwa were operational in 2019. Out of the 400 temples in Pakistan, only 13 temples are operational where members of the Hindu community perform their religious rituals.

In July 2021, over 60 Hindus were forcefully converted to Islam in the Mirpur Khas District and Mithi areas of Sindh.

A survey carried out by All Pakistan Hindu Rights Movement revealed that out of 428 Hindu temples in Pakistan only around 20 survive today and they remain neglected by the Evacuee Trust Property Board which controls those while the rest had been converted for other uses. In the aftermath of the Babri Masjid demolition Pakistani Hindus faced riots. Mobs attacked five Hindu temples in Karachi and set fire to 25 temples in towns across the province of Sindh. Shops owned by Hindus were also attacked in Sukkur. Hindu homes and temples were also attacked in Quetta. Jain Mandar at Jain Mandar Chowk in Lahore was destroyed by the bigoted Muslims mobs in 1992 and the government changed the name of Jain Mandar Chowk to Babri Masjid chowk, which became the official name. According to the Human Rights Commission of Pakistan data, just around 1,000 Hindu families fled to India in 2013. In May 2014, a member of the ruling Pakistan Muslim League-Nawaz (PML-N), Dr. Ramesh Kumar Vankwani, revealed in the National Assembly of Pakistan that around 5,000 Hindus are migrating from Pakistan to India every year.

Sikhs

In 2009, the Pakistani Taliban imposed Jizya on Non-Muslims, houses of 11 Sikh families were demolished in Orakzai Agency for refusing to pay jizya ransom.

In 2010, a Sikh youth Jaspal Singh was beheaded in Khyber Agency after his family could not pay the big Jizya ransom. Consequently, thousands of Sikhs had to abandon their homes and flee from tribal areas to resettle in areas with larger Sikh populations, such as Peshawar, Hassanabdal and Nankana Sahib.

In May 2018, a prominent Sikh leader Charanjeet Singh was shot dead in Peshawar. It was the tenth targeted murder of a prominent Sikh since 2014, and "stirred unprecedented fear – and fury – among the community’s members, particularly in Peshawar."

On 3 January 2020, Pakistani media reported that "scores of protesters surrounded the Gurdwara Nankana Sahib, on Friday afternoon, threatening to overrun the holy site if their demands for the release of suspects in an alleged forced conversion case were not met". There were also reports of stone-pelting on the shrine by a mob of angry local Muslims, that even threatened to convert it into a mosque.

On 27 July 2020, it was reported that the Gurdwara Shaheed Bhai Taru Singh, which is the site of martyrdom of Bhai Taru Singh, had been forcibly taken over and was converted into a mosque and named as Masjid Shahid Ganj.

Shias

In 2012 Jundallah militants stopped buses and massacred 18 men travelling on buses. All but one of the victims were Shia Muslim, while others on the buses were spared.

In 2012, Malik Ishaq, founder of the anti-Shia militant group Lashkar-e-Jhangvi, called Shias the "greatest infidels on earth" and demanded the country to declare them as "non-Muslims on the basis of their beliefs." Brad Adams, the Asia director of Human Rights Watch, stated that "The government’s persistent failure to apprehend attackers or prosecute the extremist groups organizing the attacks suggests that it is indifferent to this carnage."

Shia Muslims, who make up 15 to 20 per cent of the Muslim population in the country, have been "specifically targeted and killed by machine guns and suicide bombers." According to the data compiled by South Asia Terrorism Portal, there have been 446 incidents of violence against the Shia Muslims  in Pakistan between 2003 and May 2016, in which more than 2558 people have been killed and over 4518 others injured.

In 2020, the European Foundation for South Asian Studies (EFSAS) in a report entitled, Guilty until proven innocent: The sacrilegious nature of blasphemy laws Pakistan, has said that the biggest proportion of Muslims charged with blasphemy offences belong to the Shia community.  The paper has recommended wide-ranging changes to Pakistan's laws and legal systems. Thousand of Pakistanis marched for an anti-Shia protests in Karachi, the country's financial hub, during early September, 2020. The march was caused due to Shia clergies making disparaging remarks against historical Islamic figures. The remarks were televised during the Shia Ashura procession. Ashura commemorates the Battle of Karbala, which caused the schism in Islam. Sunni groups demanded that disparaging remarks against any Islamic figures were not acceptable and will not be tolerated.

On January 3 of 2021, a group of miners in Balochistan were victims of terrorist attacks.  The attackers infiltrated and ambushed a coal mine near Mach, Pakistan; after which they "separated those who belonged to an ethnic group called Hazaras, blindfolded them, tied their hands behind their backs and brutally killed them". The Hazara community is an ethnic community from central Afghanistan of Hazarajat that have a mostly strong Shia religious identity. This event lead to a nationwide outcry and protest on social media. Imran Khan responded to the atrocities by accepting the demands of the attackers which infuriated the Pakistani victims.

Sufis

The July 2010 Lahore bombings killed 50 people and wounded 200 others in two suicide bombings on the Sufi shrine, Data Durbar Complex in Lahore.

The 2016 Khuzdar bombing on a Sufi shrine in Balochistan killed more than 47 people.

Valentine's Day 

Though Valentine's Day in Pakistan is officially banned, and the Islamist orthodoxy has taken steps to obstruct celebrations, many Pakistanis celebrate the day's festivities. In recent years, youth and commercial establishments in Pakistan have supported Valentine's Day festivities and celebrating romantic friendship and love, as noted by journalists Asif Shahzad and Andrew Roche and Safia Bano, a philosophy lecturer. They note that youth in the country, where 60 percent of the population is below age 30 and half are under 18, are influenced more by global trends than traditions.  Valentine's Day serves annually as a flash point of the culture war in Pakistan.

Forced conversion

More than a 1000 minor girls, mostly Hindu are forcefully converted every year to Islam in Pakistan.

Women belonging to religious minorities have been known to be victims of kidnappings and forced conversion to Islam. Amarnath Motumal who works for Human Rights Commission of Pakistan has stated that 20 to 25 Hindu girls were kidnapped and converted every month though the exact number is impossible to estimate. Sadiq Bhanbhro, Researcher on Public Health and Gender-Based Violence at Sheffield Hallam University commented he found reports of 286 girls forcibly converted from 2012 to 2017 in English-language dailies, though this number is likely higher. The 2019 Religious Minorities in Pakistan report compiled by Members of the European Parliament has stated that independent NGOs estimate every year at least 1,000 girls are forcibly converted to Islam, although the number may be probably more due to under-reporting. A Pakistan Muslim League politician has stated that abduction of Hindus and Sikhs is a business in Pakistan, along with conversions of Hindus to Islam. Many Islamic extremists believe that it is an achievement to convert a Hindu into Islam, and to do so can earn one a blessing. Abdul Haq (Mitthu Mian) is a custodian of Bharchindi Shia Dargah, who is well known for subverting the legal process in numerous cases of kidnapping of underage Hindu girls, their forced conversion to Islam and marriage to older men at this dargah, as well as inciting violence against Hindus specially by misusing blasphemy laws.

Firstly underage girls are abducted from their homes or where they work, later re-appearing after having been married off to a Muslim. They are often raped and then forcibly converted to Islam. To prevent her from going back home or reporting the rape to the police, she is forcibly married to the perpetrator. Reports obtained by the NGO Global Human Rights Defence indicate that the perpetrators will often put a fake age of the girl on the marriage certificate to hide that she is underage. When the families of the girl try to report this to the police, they are often met by biased officers who refuse to file an FIR (First Information Report). The conversions are backed by powerful religious institutions and leaders who also offer incentives to people to convert. Moreover, the perpetrators will often force the victim to sign a report saying that she converted and married on her own free will, hindering the attempts of the family to have their girl returned to them. Additionally, the perpetrators will often file counter-suits against the victim's family for harassment and for attempting to convert the girl back to her former religion.

According to a report from the Movement for Solidarity and Peace also cited by the European Parliament, about 1,000 non-Muslim girls are converted to Islam each year in Pakistan. According to the Pakistan Hindu Council, religious persecution, especially forced conversions, remains the foremost reason for migration of Hindus from Pakistan. Pakistan Hindu Council estimated that about 5000 Hindus migrate from Pakistan to India every year in order to escape religious persecution. Religious institutions like Bharchundi Sharif and Sarhandi Pir support forced conversions and are known to have support and protection of ruling political parties of Sindh. This practice is being reported increasingly in the districts of Tharparkar, Umerkot and Mirpur Khas in Sindh.

A total of 57 Hindus converted in Pasrur during May 14–19, 2010. On May 14, 35 Hindus of the same family were forced to convert by their employer because his sales dropped after Muslims started boycotting his eatable items as they were prepared by Hindus as well as their persecution by the Muslim employees of neighboring shops according to their relatives. Since the impoverished Hindu had no other way to earn and needed to keep the job to survive, they converted. 14 members of the another family converted on May 17 since no one was employing them, later another Hindu man and his family of eight under pressure from Muslims to avoid their land being grabbed.

Rinkle Kumari, a 19-year Pakistani student, Lata Kumari, and Asha Kumari, a Hindu working in a beauty parlor, were allegedly forced to convert from Hinduism to Islam. Their cases were appealed all the way to the Supreme Court of Pakistan. The appeal was admitted but remained unheard ever after. Rinkle was abducted by a gang and "forced" to convert to Islam, before being head shaved. Afterwards, Rinkle reportedly stated that she will stay with her husband rather than return home - her husband and the son of Mitthu Mian met her several times just before her final statement in the Supreme Court. In March 2019, two Hindu minor girls were allegedly abducted on the eve of Holi and forcibly converted to Islam in Dharki, Ghotki District, Sindh. A video showed them being married by a Muslim cleric and another also emerged showing the girls claiming they converted out of their own will. Pakistan Prime Minister Imran Khan has ordered an investigation into the accusations. On 11 April, Pakistan High Court let the Hindu girls live with their husbands, stated both teenage girls are adult and marry to men with their own will, parents of both girls accepted the verdict and asked for more time. The court gave the verdict that the Hindu girls were not forcefully converted, abducted and they converted to Islam voluntarily and on their own will.

In 2017, the Sikh community in Hangu district of Pakistan's Khyber-Pakhtunkhwa province alleged that they were “being forced to convert to Islam” by a government official. Farid Chand Singh, who filed the complaint, has claimed that Assistant Commissioner Tehsil Tall Yaqoob Khan was allegedly forcing Sikhs to convert to Islam and the residents of Doaba area are being tortured religiously. According to reports, about 60 Sikhs of Doaba had demanded security from the administration.

Many Hindus voluntarily convert to Islam for easily getting Watan Cards and National Identification Cards. These converts were also given land and money. For example, 428 poor Hindus in Matli were converted between 2009 and 2011 by the Madrassa Baitul Islam, a Deobandi seminary in Matli, which pays off the debts of Hindus converting to Islam. Another example is the conversion of 250 Hindus to Islam in Chohar Jamali area in Thatta. Conversions are also carried out by ex-Hindu Baba Deen Mohammad Shaikh mission which converted 108,000 people to Islam since 1989.

In 2017, a human rights activist claimed that, "At least 25 conversions of young Hindu girls and women take place every month in Umerkot's Kunri and Samaro talukas alone. This area is so deprived and the people, most of whom belong to the scheduled castes, are so powerless that the families know there’s no use in them reporting forced conversions to the police, let alone raising a hue and cry." In 2014 alone, 265 legal cases of forced conversion were reported, mostly involving Hindu girls.

In July 2019, Sindh-based activist Duo Kalhoro stated that "Current statistics estimate that every month, 20 Hindu girls are abducted and converted to Islam" in her province. She added that "Most of the victims are under the age of 18. Some as young as 11 years old. Once the girls have been married off and converted, they are prohibited from contacting their families, leaving them even more vulnerable to exploitation."

Blasphemy Law

The Pakistan Blasphemy Law derives from section 295-C of the Pakistan Penal Code which states that whoever "defiles the sacred name of the Holy Prophet Muhammad (peace be upon him) shall be punished with death, or imprisonment for life, and shall also be liable to fine." This law is phrased in vague terms (therefore violating the principle of legality), and is often used to level false accusations at people from religious minorities. ‘Sentences for these offences range from fines to long terms of imprisonment, and in the case of defamation of the Prophet Muhammad, a mandatory death sentence.’ 'This law thus serves as a legal justification to persecute religious minorities, or any other person, by means of false accusations in pursuit of personal vendettas or disputes'. By failing to repeal this law, the government is complicit in encouraging discriminatory prosecutions.

Asia Bibi is a Pakistani Christian woman who was convicted of blasphemy by a Pakistani court, receiving a sentence of death by hanging. In June 2009, Bibi was involved in an argument with a group of Muslim women with whom she had been harvesting berries after the other women grew angry with her for drinking the same water as them. She was subsequently accused of insulting the Islamic prophet Muhammad, a charge she denies, and was arrested and imprisoned. In November 2010, a Sheikhupura judge sentenced her to death. If executed, Bibi would be the first woman in Pakistan to be lawfully killed for blasphemy.

In August 2012, Rimsha Masih, a Christian girl, reportedly 11 or 14 years old, and an illiterate with mental disabilities was accused of blasphemy for  burning pages from a book containing Quranic verses. The allegation came from a Muslim cleric who himself has subsequently been accused by the police of framing the girl. The girl, and later the cleric, were both arrested and released on bail.

In 2014 Junaid Jamshed was accused under the blasphemy law. According to The Economist, Jamshed "is unable to return to Pakistan after being accused of mocking one of the Prophet’s wives in a throwaway remark about the weakness of women."

In March 2017 a Hindu man Prakash Kumar was arrested on the charges of blasphemy in the province of Balochistan.

Critics of the blasphemy laws have called for change. In 2019, the US Secretary of State Mike Pompeo appealed to Pakistan to stop the misuse of the law, estimating that over 40 people were serving life sentences or facing execution for blasphemy in Pakistan.

Demographics

According to 1951 census, Non-Muslims constituted 14.20% of total Pakistan's (West Pakistan and East Pakistan) population. In the West Pakistan (now Pakistan), the Non-Muslims constituted 3.44% of the total population while East Pakistan (now Bangladesh) had a significant share comprising 23.20 percent of the population therein.

Much of the decrease in minorities of Pakistan has occurred due to the events around the partition of India, the wars of 1965 and 1971. It has been attributed to reasons like communal violence and discrimination that minority communities face. In the 1941 census of India, areas of modern Pakistan had a population of 5.9 million Non-Muslims. After the Partition of India, about 5 million Hindus and Sikhs left the country.

It is estimated that 95% of Pakistanis are Muslims (75-95% Sunni, 5-20% Shia).

The Ahmadiyya have faced greater persecution since 1974 after being declared "non Muslims" over allegations that they do not recognize Muhammad as the last prophet.

In addition, there have been many cases of religious persecution in of Hindus in the nation.  Among these, the most recent include 19-year-old Hindu girl Rinkle Kumari from Mirpur Mathelo in Ghotki district, Sindh province who was abducted by a gang and "forced" to convert to Islam, before being head shaved.

Another recent case was the gunning down of four Hindu doctors in Chak town, Shikarpur sparking fears and panic among the minority community.

Education system

The 2019 report on Religious Minorities in Pakistan compiled by Members of the European Parliament found: "The curriculum in Pakistani schools includes compulsory reading of Qu’ ran, the ideology of Pakistan based on the Islam, the Jihad and Shahadat path. The textbooks in schools extend the intolerance with systematic negative portrayals of minorities, especially Hindus. While teachings avoid denoting the contribution of religious minorities to the cultural, military and civic life of Pakistan, anti-Islamic forces are declared to endanger its very existence. By historic revisionism and unsubstantiated claims which convey religious bias, the Islamic civilization is glorified while religious minorities are denigrated."

In 2011 the United States Commission on International Religious Freedom (USCIRF) released a report on the public schools and Madrassas in Pakistan. The study concluded: Public school textbooks used by all children often had a strong Islamic orientation, 
Public school and madrassa teachers had limited awareness or understanding of religious minorities and their beliefs, and were divided on whether religious minorities were citizens;
Teachers often expressed very negative views about Ahmadis, Christians, and Jews, and successfully transmitted these biases to their students;
Interviewees' expressions of tolerance often were intermixed with neutral and intolerant comments, leaving some room for improvement.

Constitution 

Tolerance for religious discrimination can be found in the Constitution of Pakistan. Islam is named as the religion of the state, and whilst there is a provision allowing for minorities to practice their religions, they are still subject to the principles of 'democracy, freedom, equality, tolerance and social justice as enunciated by Islam'.

Certain provisions are outrightly discriminatory - such as article 41(2) which provides that only Muslims can become president, thereby denying minorities the chance to hold the highest position of power. The Constitution also provides for the set up of the Islamic Council, created to safeguard Islamic ideology. The Islamic Council can shape governmental decisions, actions and policy, which creates an institutionalized priority for Islamic ideas to the detriment of religious minorities.

See also

 Persecution of religious minorities in Pakistan
 2020 Karak temple attack
 Asia Bibi blasphemy case
 Freedom of religion in Pakistan
 Sectarian violence in Pakistan
 Human rights in Pakistan
 LGBT rights in Pakistan
 Pakistan National Commission for Minorities

References

External links
 Pakistan's Shias fear sectarian attacks

Human rights abuses in Pakistan
 
 
Persecution of Hindus
Persecution of Sikhs
Persecution by Muslims